Taylorsburg is a neighborhood of the city of Trotwood in northwestern Montgomery County, Ohio, United States.

History
A post office called Taylorsburgh was established in 1880, the name was changed to Taylorsburg in 1893, and the post office closed in 1915. In 1909, Taylorsburg had 135 inhabitants.

References

Geography of Montgomery County, Ohio
Neighborhoods in Ohio